The 25 mm Hotchkiss anti-tank gun was a French anti-tank gun from the 1930s, built by the Hotchkiss arsenal, that saw service in the Spanish Civil War, the Second World War and the Indochina War.

Light and mobile, it could be improvised into a portée weapon by its users.

Development

By the early 1920s the French Army had come to the realization that the armour-piercing capability of the 37 mm TRP infantry gun would be insufficient against modern tanks. In 1926 Hotchkiss proposed a 25 mm in-house design developed by its design office. This model was accepted for service in 1934 under the designation canon de 25 mm semi-automatique modèle 1934 ("25 mm semi-automatic gun model 1934", generally shortened to canon de 25).
At the outbreak of World War II, it was the main anti-tank weapon of the French infantry. By May 1940, there were reported to be 6,000 in service with the French Army, although some formations were still waiting for their full allocation.

In action in the Battle of France in 1940, it was found that the projectile was too small to be very effective against German tanks, especially at longer ranges. It remained a useful weapon against armoured cars and other light armoured vehicles.
In 1935 the Hotchkiss 25 mm anti-tank gun was purchased for evaluation by the US Army. Turkey bought 400 examples of the gun during the interwar period. During the Spanish Civil War, a few examples of the Hotchkiss gun reached the anti-Franco Republican forces. Some were mounted on captured Panzer I tanks.

Variants
 25 AC mle 1934: So-called de forteresse (fortress version), adopted to equip the Maginot Line. The 25mm gun was not used alone but as a mixed weapon. It was therefore associated with a twinning of Reibel machine guns sharing the same ball joint in a "trumelage" which had a single sight, common to both types of weapons. The length of the tube was reduced depending on the type of bell in which the trumelage was to be mounted, the length of the field gun being kept by the mounting in the casemate.
25 APX SAL 35: Shortened version, designed in 1935 in the Puteaux workshops (hence the acronym APX) to equip the Panhard 178 armoured car.
 25 APX SAL 1937: a lengthened 77 caliber derivative designed by the APX with a much lighter  carriage. Some examples were used by the Romanian Army.

Combat use

France 
At the outbreak of World War II, the 25 SA-L model 1934 was assigned to almost all armored and anti-tank units of the French army, while the 25 SA-L model 1937 was used in support companies of the infantry battalions.
Despite its low caliber which forced its servants to target precisely the weak points of the opposing tanks, it remained for the time a powerful anti-tank gun against the Panzer II, III and IV which constituted the majority of the German tanks during the invasion of France by the Nazi regime. The 25 illustrated itself at the Battle of Stonne, during the first combat of May 15, 1940 where a single 25mm gun laying in ambush on the edge of the village neutralized 3 Panzer IV tanks in 5 minutes. During the defense of Rouen on June 9, 1940, when one of them located at the foot of the old Corneille bridge placed in its line of sight the German tanks which descended the rue de la République and fired several shots, destroying two panzers. According to another version of the facts, a Renault R35 tank, laying in ambush near the barricade, would be at the origin of the destruction of one of the two panzers; in any case, it cannot have been caused by the Renault FT tanks as they were only equipped with machine guns.

Britain 
When the British Expeditionary Force landed in France in 1939 it had insufficient numbers of anti-tank weapons such as the Ordnance QF 2 pounder. They were issued 300 canons de 25 which became known as Anti-Tank Gun, 25 mm. Hotchkiss, Mark I on 25 mm. Carriage, Mark I in British service. The BEF was fully mechanised and attempted to tow the weapon behind their vehicles, but quickly found that it was not robust enough because British troops had been issued with the hippomobile version of the cannon (designed to be towed by horses). The solution was to use the gun as a portée, that is, carried in the back of a truck. It was the first artillery piece to be used in this way.

Germany 

Falling in large numbers into the hands of the Germans after the defeat of 1940, the gun was put back into service with the Wehrmacht under the designation 2,5 cm Pak 112(f) for mle 1934 guns and 2,5 cm Pak 113(f) for mle 1937 guns, with the (f) for französische ("French").

Italy 
Some captured guns also made it into Italian service in North Africa as alternatives to the Solothurn S-18/1000, under the designation cannone da 25/72.

Finland 

Finland purchased 50 French 25 mm APX M/37 anti-tank guns during the Winter War  through Aladar Paasonen, but only 40 of them were delivered in February 1940 through Norway. The remaining ten guns were captured by the Germans when they invaded Norway in the spring of 1940. About half of the guns, which had arrived during the Winter War, saw front line service and three of them were lost in battle. During the Interim Peace the Germans sold 200 captured guns to Finland. 133 of them were model M/34s and 67 were model M/37s, and they were designated 25 PstK/34 and 25 PstK/37, respectively, bearing the nickname of "Marianne". They then served in the Continuation War, until being withdrawn from front line service by 1943.

Viet Minh 
Some were used by the Việt Minh at the beginning of the First Indochina War.

See also
 47 mm APX anti-tank gun
 Type 96 25 mm AT/AA Gun
 5 cm Pak 38

Notes

References
 jaegerplatoon.net
 Zaloga, Steven J., Brian Delf (2005). US Anti-tank Artillery 1941–45. Osprey Publishing. .

External links 
 

World War II weapons of France
World War II anti-tank guns
25 mm artillery
Military equipment introduced in the 1930s